Kristen Skjeldal (born 27 May 1967) is an Olympic champion and cross-country skier from Norway.  He has won three olympic medals: two gold and one bronze.  He won his first gold medal in the 4 × 10 km relay at the 1992 Winter Olympics in Albertville. He finished fourth in 30 km freestyle event at the 2002 Winter Olympics in Salt Lake City, but was awarded the bronze medal upon Spain's Johann Mühlegg EPO-doping disqualification. Subsequently, devices for blood doping were found at the hotel room of the doctor for the Austrian cross-country team. Since Skjeldal won the bronze behind two Austrians, many regard him as the real olympic champion. Skjeldal also won a gold medal in 4 × 10 km relay at those same games.

His best finish at the Nordic skiing World Championships was a sixth in the 50 km event in 1999.  Skjeldal has also won thirteen cross-country skiing events of various distances between 1991 and 2006.

Skjeldal was still an active skier in 2005, located in his ski club in Bulken, Norway. His brother Gudmund Skjeldal also has participated in the Olympics.

In 2005 Gudmund published a biography about his brother, called Den siste langrennaren.

Almost 45 years old, Skjeldal did a remarkable comeback at the Norwegian Championship 2012, finishing eight at the 15 km free, beating all of the Norwegian team elite squad, except Martin Johnsrud Sundby, who won.

Cross-country skiing results
All results are sourced from the International Ski Federation (FIS).

Olympic Games
 3 medals – (2 gold, 1 bronze)

World Championships

World Cup

Season standings

Individual podiums
1 victory 
11 podiums

Team podiums
 12 victories
 22 podiums

Note:   Until the 1994 Olympics, Olympic races were included in the World Cup scoring system.

References

External links 
 
 From the publisher Samlaget (in Norwegian)

1967 births
Living people
Norwegian male cross-country skiers
Olympic cross-country skiers of Norway
Olympic gold medalists for Norway
Olympic bronze medalists for Norway
Cross-country skiers at the 1992 Winter Olympics
Cross-country skiers at the 2002 Winter Olympics
Olympic medalists in cross-country skiing
Medalists at the 2002 Winter Olympics
Medalists at the 1992 Winter Olympics